Stirton Smith (28 October 1926 – 2010) was a Scottish professional footballer.

Smith died in Midlothian in 2010, at the age of 83.

References

External links 

1926 births
2010 deaths
Date of death missing
Sportspeople from Midlothian
Scottish footballers
Heart of Midlothian F.C. players
Third Lanark A.C. players
Dunfermline Athletic F.C. players
Arniston Rangers F.C. players
Association football wingers
Scottish Football League players